The "Anvil Chorus" is the English name for the  (Italian for "Gypsy chorus"), a chorus from act 2, scene 1 of Giuseppe Verdi's 1853 opera Il trovatore. It depicts Spanish Gypsies striking their anvils at dawn – hence its English name – and singing the praises of hard work, good wine, and Gypsy women. The piece is also commonly known by its opening words, "".

Italian libretto and poetic English adaptation

Other uses

Thomas Baker wrote Il Trovatore Quadrille (1855) for piano, which includes a movement based on this chorus. Similarly, pianist/composer Charles Grobe wrote variations on the Anvil Chorus for piano in 1857. A swing jazz arrangement by Jerry Gray for the Glenn Miller Orchestra in 1941 reached #3 on the U.S. Billboard charts. The melodic theme also served as the inspiration for "Rockin' the Anvil" for swing jazz ensemble and accordion on John Serry Sr.'s 1956 album Squeeze Play. 

The tune of the chorus was closely parodied in "The Burglar's Chorus" ("With cat-like tread") in Gilbert and Sullivan's 1879 comic opera The Pirates of Penzance, and soon after became a popular song with the lyrics Hail, Hail, the Gang's All Here.

References

Opera excerpts
1853 compositions
Compositions by Giuseppe Verdi
Choral compositions